Circumstantial Evidence is a 1935 drama film directed by Charles Lamont and starring Chick Chandler, Shirley Grey and Arthur Vinton.

Cast
 Chick Chandler as James Richard 'Jim' Baldwin  
 Shirley Grey as Adrienne Grey  
 Arthur Vinton as Fred Stevens  
 Claude King as Ralph Winters  
 Dorothy Revier as Bernice Winters  
 Lee Moran as Spike Horton  
 Carl Stockdale as George Malone  
 Eddie Phillips as Harris  
 Edward Keane as Judge Samuels 
 Robert Frazer as District Attorney  
 Huntley Gordon as The Governor 
 Lew Kelly as Detective Taylor 
 Barbara Bedford as Mrs. Goodwin  
 Al Bridge as John Cassidy  
 Don Brodie as The Bailiff  
 Ralph Brooks as Joe  
 Eddy Chandler as Prison Guard Henderson  
 Phyllis Crane as A Dumb Dame 
 Charles Doretya s Prison Guard 
 Robert Elliott as Detective Brown  
 Henry Hall as Prison Warden  
 Lloyd Ingraham as Judge Robertson  
 Charles McAvoy as Prison Guard Kelly  
 Lafe McKee as Jury Foreman  
 Spec O'Donnell as Sydney  
 Rose Plumer as Member of the Jury 
 Al Thompson as Mosher

References

Bibliography
 Michael R. Pitts. Poverty Row Studios, 1929–1940: An Illustrated History of 55 Independent Film Companies, with a Filmography for Each. McFarland & Company, 2005.

External links
 

1935 films
1935 crime drama films
American crime drama films
Films directed by Charles Lamont
Chesterfield Pictures films
American black-and-white films
1930s English-language films
1930s American films